Arthur Theodore Mosher  (October 4, 1910 – September 27, 1992), was an American agriculture development specialist who was the president of the Agricultural Development Council and the Principal of the Sam Higginbottom Institute of Agriculture, Technology and Sciences (at the time it was called Allahabad Agricultural Institute) in India.

Early life and work
Mosher was originally from Ames, Iowa, receiving his bachelor's and master's degrees in agriculture and agriculture economics from the University of Illinois, and a doctorate in economics from the University of Chicago. In the 1930s he served on a Presbyterian Church mission to India.

He returned to India and became principal of the school which would later be named Sam Higginbottom Institute of Agriculture, Technology and Sciences. The school credits him with leading during a time of major expansion and the introduction of  "Jamuna Par Punar yojna", the extension project of recruiting workers at the village level.

He began working for the Agricultural Development Council and became both the executive director (1957 to 1967) and president (1967 to 1973).  While Mosher was head of the Council of Economic and Cultural Affairs division of the ADC, he continued a practice of his predecessor in exercising "considerable censorship" over the texts the organization approved to be delivered to extension offices throughout the world, eliminating many requests for books on social and cultural topics.

Getting Agriculture Moving
In 1965, while Director of CECA-ADC, he wrote Getting Agriculture  Moving: essentials for development and modernization which was translated into many languages and promoted a "modernization theory" which typified the aid approach of the time.  In his writing, Mosher identified five components necessary for successful rural and agricultural development, which was by 1987 "particularly influential" in promoting a "systems analysis" approach to development that recognizes complex interactions. The framework developed from a series of individual papers.

The five components that Mosher identified as necessary for development were:
a market for the products,
adaptability to changing technologies,
locally available inputs such as equipment and supplies,
increasing the quality and amount of agricultural land,
the existence of a national plan to support agricultural development.

The title of the work was adopted by Peter Timmer for his work Getting Agriculture Moving: Do Market's Send the Right signals?  Timmer and others place Mosher's focus on "getting agriculture moving" as appropriate for the first of four phases of development.

Personal life
Mosher was married to Alice (née Wynne Hall) and together they had four children, Anne,  William,  Ted,  and Richard. Mosher lived in Ithaca, New York for several years before moving to Black Mountain, North Carolina where he died in 1992.

Awards
 Presidential World Without Hunger Award  (1984)
 American Agricultural Economics Association - Fellow (1976)

Selected bibliography
Getting Agriculture Moving: essentials for development and modernization
Training manual for group study of Getting agriculture moving
Selected readings to accompany Getting agriculture moving, co authored with Raymond Borton
Case Studies to Accompany Getting Agriculture Moving, co authored with Borton
Getting agriculture moving; how modern farming can provide a better life, co authored with Deborah Homes
Technical co-operation in Latin-American agriculture
Serving agriculture as an administrator
An introduction to agricultural extension
Images of development : theirs and ours
The story of Ram Lal, God's partner; the meaning and application of Christianity to village life
Source book of rural missions. Volume 1, Selected readings, contributor
This is India

References

American agronomists
American Presbyterians
University of Illinois alumni
1992 deaths
1910 births
20th-century agronomists